Yankang (延康) was a Chinese era name used by several emperors of China. It may refer to:

Yankang (220), era name used by Emperor Xian of Han
Yankang (619–620), era name used by Shen Faxing
Yankang, brand name used by Qingdao Yankang Plastic Machinery Co.,Ltd